3-Hydroxyisobutyryl-CoA (or 3-hydroxy-2-methylpropanoyl-CoA) is an intermediate in the metabolism of valine.

See also
 3-hydroxyisobutyryl-CoA hydrolase
 3-Hydroxyisobutyryl-CoA deacylase deficiency

Thioesters of coenzyme A